What Matters Most is the upcoming sixth studio  album by American singer-songwriter Ben Folds, his first album since So There in 2015. The album is scheduled to be released on June 2, 2023, by New West Records. 

The album was announced on February 15, 2023, along with the release of the first single from the album, "Winslow Gardens". Folds will tour the U.S. and Europe starting on March 24, 2023, in Eau Claire, Wisconsin, and ending on December 4, 2023, in Essen, Germany.

In an interview Folds called his album his most "true" to date, saying "I come from the vinyl era, and this perhaps more than any record I've made is a true album. There's a very specific sequence and arc to each side, all building up to this almost surreal positive finale, and that structure was really important to me." In the same interview, he says "Sonically, lyrically, emotionally, I don't think it's an album I could have made at any other point in my career.".

Track listing

References

2023 albums
Ben Folds albums
New West Records albums
Upcoming albums